Trstenik Airport  (Latin: Aerodrom Trstenik) also known as "Odžaci" is an airport in Serbia, 2.5 km from the town of Trstenik and 12 km from the spa of Vrnjačka Banja. The airport is within the closest vicinity (60 kilometers-about 50 minutes by Bus, instead 2 hours 45 mins from Niš Constantine the Great Airport transfer) to the famous Kopaonik mountain ski resort, and is also 20 kilometers from the Goč mountain.

In 1990, construction work came to a finish on the building of both a new control tower and underground fuel tanks.

History
On 4 July 1965, Jat Airways, then known as JAT Yugoslav Airlines, opened route between Belgrade and spa resort Vrnjačka Banja with a Convair CV-440 Metropolitan aircraft.

In 2007, the Vrnjačka Banja resort and the Trstenik airport requested approval for opening the airport to the public. The government will most likely accept the proposal.

See also
List of airports in Serbia

External links
 
 Trstenik Airport at Panoramio
Aero Sports
 Trstenik airport information (PDF)
 Srbija će imati 16 malih aerodroma
 Poleće biznis sa vojne piste

Airports in Serbia